Konstantin Vladimirovich Rodzaevsky (– 30 August 1946) was the leader of the Russian Fascist Party, which he led in exile from Manchuria. Rodzaevsky was also the chief editor of the RFP paper Nash Put'. After the defeat of anti-communist forces in the Russian Civil War, he and his followers fled to Manchuria in 1925. He was lured by the NKVD to return to the Soviet Union with false promises of immunity and executed in a Lubyanka prison cellar after a trial for "anti-Soviet and counter-revolutionary activities".

Far Eastern Fascism
Born in Blagoveshchensk (across the Amur from China) in a family of the Siberian middle-class, he fled the Soviet Union for Manchuria in 1925. In Harbin, Rodzaevsky entered the law academy and joined the Russian Fascist Organization. On May 26, 1931, he became the Secretary General of the newly created Russian Fascist Party; in 1934 the Party amalgamated with the All-Russian Fascist Organization of Anastasy Vonsyatsky, Rodzaevsky becoming its leader. He modeled himself on Benito Mussolini, and also used the Swastika as one of the symbols of the movement.

Rodzaevsky collected around himself personally selected bodyguards, using the symbolism of the former Russian Empire and Russian nationalist symbols; like the Italian Blackshirts, the Russian Fascists wore black uniforms with black crossed belts. Rodzaevsky's black shirts were armed with weapons obtained from the Imperial Japanese Army. They created an international organization of White émigrés with a central office in Harbin, the "Far East Moscow", and made connections in twenty-six nations around the world. The most important of these international posts were in New York City.

Manchukuo

Rodzaevsky had around 12,000 followers in Manchukuo. During the 2,600th anniversary of the founding of the Empire of Japan, Rodzaevsky, with a select group of people, paid his respects to Emperor Hirohito at the official celebration in the region.

The fascists installed a great swastika illuminated by neon light at their branch in Manzhouli (Manchouli), at least 3km from the Soviet border. It was kept on all day and night to provide a show of power against the Soviet government. Rodzaevsky awaited the day when, leaving these signs on the Russian border, he would lead the White Anti-Soviet forces, joining White General Kislitsin and Japanese forces, into battle to "liberate the people of Russia from Soviet rule". Their main military acts involved the training of the Asano Detachment, an entirely ethnic-Russian special force in the Kwantung Army, organized for carrying out sabotage against Soviet forces in case of any Japanese invasion of Siberia. Japan was apparently interested in creating a White Russian regime in Outer Manchuria.

World War II and execution
During World War II, Rodzaevsky tried to launch an open struggle against Bolshevism, but Japanese authorities limited the RFP’s activities to acts of sabotage in the Soviet Union. A notorious anti-Semite, Rodzaevsky published numerous articles in the party newspapers Our way and The Nation; he was also the author of the brochure "Judas’ End" and the book "Contemporary Judaisation of the World or the Jewish Question in the 20th Century".

At the end of the war, likely fearing reprisal during the Soviet invasion of Manchuria, Rodzaevsky claimed that Joseph Stalin's regime was evolving into a nationalist one. He surrendered to Soviet authorities in Harbin in 1945, with a letter that shows striking similarities with the doctrines of National Bolshevism: 

He returned to Russia, where he was promised freedom and a job in one of the Soviet newspapers. Instead, he was arrested upon arrival (along with fellow party-member Lev Okhotin). The trial, which began on August 26, 1946, was widely covered in the Soviet press. It was opened by the chairman of the Military Collegium of the Supreme Court of the Soviet Union, Vasily Ulrikh. Rodzaevsky and other leaders of the RFP were charged with anti-Soviet agitation, creation of the Russian Fascist Party and distributing anti-Soviet propaganda among White army exiles and creation of similar anti-Soviet organizations in China, Europe and the United States. In addition, according to the verdict, he was involved in preparing an attack on the Soviet Union, together with a number of Japanese generals, as well as personally organizing spies and terrorist groups against the Soviet Union with the cooperation of German and Japanese intelligence. All of the defendants pleaded guilty.   

Rodzaevsky was sentenced to death. Also sentenced to various punishments were Grigory Semyonov, Vasilevsky Lev Fillipovich, Baksheev Aleksei Proklovich, Lev Okhotin, Ukhtomsky and others. Rozaevsky was executed in a Lubyanka prison cellar on 30 August 1946.

In 2001, Rodzaevsky's final book, The Last Will of a Russian Fascist ("Zaveshchanie russkogo fashista"), was published in Russia. On 11 October 2010, due to a decision by the Central District Court of Krasnoyarsk, the book became recognized in Russia as extremist material, and has been included in the Federal List of Extremist Materials (No. 861).

References

Notes
The Russian Fascists: Tragedy and Farce in Exile, 1925-1945 by John J. Stephan 
К. В. Родзаевский. Завещание Русского фашиста. М., ФЭРИ-В, 2001 
 А.В. Окороков. Фашизм и русская эмиграция (1920-1945 гг.). М., Руссаки, 2002 
Knútr Benoit: Konstantin Rodzaevsky. Dict, 2012,

External links 
 Inventory to the John J. Stephan Collection, 1932—1978

1907 births
1946 deaths
People from Blagoveshchensk
People from Amur Oblast (Russian Empire)
Members of the Russian Fascist Party
Antisemitism in Russia
Russian anti-communists
White movement people
White Russian emigrants to China
People of Manchukuo
People executed by the Soviet Union by firearm
People who emigrated to escape Bolshevism
Russian collaborators with Nazi Germany
Russian collaborators with Imperial Japan
Executed Russian collaborators with Nazi Germany
Executed collaborators with Imperial Japan
Russian nationalists
Executed people from Amur Oblast
National Bolsheviks
Russian fascists